Izarra can refer to:

 Izarra, Álava, a village in Álava, Spain
 Izarra (liqueur), a herbal liqueur from the Northern Basque Country
 Adina Izarra (born 1959), a Venezuelan musician, music educator and composer
 CD Izarra, a football club from Navarre

cs:Izarra
ja:イザラ